La Petite Patrie was a French Canadian television program from Quebec. It was broadcast between 1974 and 1976.

This television series of Claude Jasmin told the life of a district of Montreal (Villeray) formed by the quadrilateral of the streets Saint-Denis, Beaubien, St-Hubert and Bélanger shortly after the war, between 1946 and 1948.

The main character and narrator of this television series is Clément Germain, a 16 year old teenager who lived in this district with his family. Through the memories of Clément, viewers discovered this neighborhood during the years of Duplessis; with its trams, its ice deliverymen, its guénillou and its anglophone Chinese launderer among others. At that time, bread cost 11 cents, Maurice Richard was at the peak of his glory and the Rivoli theatre had not yet been replaced by a Jean-Coutu.

Cast
Vincent Bilodeau, (Clément Germain)
René Caron
Mariette Duval, (Madame Laramée)
Janine Fluet
Michel Forget, (Roland)
Jacques Galipeau, (Edmond Germain)
Louise Laparé, (Lucie Germain)
Gaston Lepage
Robert Maltais, (Yvon)
Christiane Pasquier, (Murielle Germain)
Gilles Pellerin, (Monsieur Gloutnez)
Denise Proulx
Louise Rinfret, (Marie-Paule Germain)
Gisèle Schmidt, (Gertrude Germain)
Yvon Thiboutot, (Coco-la-guerre)
Jacques Thisdale, (Hervé Prud'Homme)

Writer
Claude Jasmin

Director
Florent Forget

1970s Canadian sitcoms
Television shows set in Montreal
1974 Canadian television series debuts
1976 Canadian television series endings
Ici Radio-Canada Télé original programming